Fleet Aircraft was a Canadian manufacturer of aircraft from 1928 to 1957.

In 1928, the board of Consolidated Aircraft decided to drop their light trainer aircraft and sold the rights to Brewster Aircraft. Reuben H. Fleet founded Fleet Aircraft in Fort Erie, Ontario, to acquire the foreign rights to these aircraft. Consolidated bought back Fleet Aircraft as a separate division in 1929 and formed Fleet Aircraft of Canada in 1930. The Fleet name was dropped for the Consolidated business name in 1939. Fleet Aircraft of Canada produced the Fleet Finch for the RCAF,  and later the Fleet Canuck. Fleet developed a prototype light helicopter, which flew successfully, but was not put into production. Fleet ended aircraft manufacturing operations in 1957. The company was renamed Fleet Aerospace, and operated as a division of Magellan Aerospace.

The Fleet Aerospace division was closed in 2003, and later re-opened as Fleet Canada.  The new company was not affiliated with Magellan Aerospace, and it has operated independently since.

Aircraft

References

Notes

Bibliography

 Page, Ron D. and Cumming, William. Fleet: The Flying Years. Erin, Ontario: Boston Mills Press, 1990. .

Defunct aircraft manufacturers of the United States
Defunct helicopter manufacturers of the United States